Francis James Magor (28 June 1886 – 12 April 1951) was an Australian rules footballer who played for the Port Adelaide Football Club in the South Australian Football League (SAFL).

References 

1886 births
1951 deaths
Australian rules footballers from South Australia
Port Adelaide Football Club (SANFL) players
Port Adelaide Football Club players (all competitions)